Shane Van Boening (born July 14, 1983) is an American professional pool player from Rapid City, South Dakota. Van Boening is considered one of the best players of all time. Van Boening has won the WPA World Nine-ball Championship and has won the U.S. Open 9-Ball Championship on 5 occasions, including a winner of over 100 professional titles.

Van Boening has a hearing impairment and uses a hearing aid, but it does not affect his pool ability. He has received praise for his attitude towards the sport, partially for his behavior during matches, and for eschewing alcohol.

Professional career

Van Boening has a family background in pool. His grandfather, Gary Bloomberg, was a trick-shot artist; his grandmother, Jeanne Bloomberg, a VNEA national champion; his mother, Timi Bloomberg, a BCA national champion; and his aunt, Gari Jo Bloomberg, a three-time VNEA national champion.

Van Boening defeated Hungarian Vilmos Foldes at the International Pool Tour qualifier in 2006, and was one of several players to earn a bonus of US$5,000 for breaking and running six consecutive racks in tournament play. He was one of 10 players to earn their IPT tour card by finishing in the top two spots of one of five qualifiers, and won the second spot held at the Pool Room in Atlanta, Georgia. He has been ranked number one in the world by AZBilliards.com. He practices at Lucky Billiards in Sioux Falls, where he is the house pro and co-owner.

Van Boening is a three-time VNEA national amateur eight-ball champion. In 2007, he reached the final of the BCA Open Nine-ball Championship, losing to Dennis Orcollo. A few days later, he won the Predator International Ten-Ball Championship.

In 2007, Van Boening was tipped by Inside POOL Magazine as a possible future best pool player in the US. Van Boening captured the hot seat in the World Summit of Pool on June 16, 2007, beating 2004 WPA Men's World Nine-ball Champion Alex Pagulayan 11–4. On the last day, all matches were shortened to best of 13 as they were being recorded by ESPN. Pagulayan beat Francisco Bustamante and Warren Kiamco to face Van Boening in the final. Van Boening came back from 4–1 behind to tie the score 5–5, before Pagulayan won the next two games win, 7–5.

Mark Griffin, owner of the Billiards Congress of America Pool League, began sponsoring Van Boening in 2007. On October 20, 2007, Van Boening won the 32nd US Open Nine-ball Championship, defeating Filipino champion Ronnie Alcano in the finals by 13–10. Van Boening remained undefeated in the double-elimination format of the championship, held in Chesapeake, Virginia. At the Reno Open Nine-ball Championship on December 9, 2007, Van Boening and Johnny Archer were in the double-elimination finals. Archer was undefeated until then, and Van Boening had to beat him twice; Van Boening won the first set, and 83 minutes later, claimed the championship.

He has been named "Player of the Year" by the Billiards Digest Magazine and "AZBilliards" in 2007, 2011, 2012, 2013, 2014 and 2018. In 2020, he was named "Player of the Decade" for the 2010s by the Billiards Digest Magazine.

In April 2022, Van Boening won the 2022 WPA World Nine-ball Championship.

As of 2023, He holds the record for the AZBilliards Money List at over $2 million in earnings since 2005. The AZBilliards Money List has recorded tournament results of players, primarily in the United States, since the early 2000s.

Career titles and achievements

References

External links
 "Shane Van Boening: Year in Review" – most current results and statistics for this player available at AZBilliards.com: The A to Z of Billiards and Pool, with links to previous years

American pool players
American people of Dutch descent
Living people
Sportspeople from Rapid City, South Dakota
1983 births
9-Ball players
Deaf sportspeople
Competitors at the 2022 World Games